The women's double-mini trampoline competition in trampoline gymnastics at the 2009 World Games took place on 22 July 2009 at the Kaohsiung in Kaohsiung Arena, Chinese Taipei.

Competition format
A total of 10 athletes entered the competition. Best 8 athletes from preliminary advances to the final.

Results

Preliminary

Final

References

External links
 Results on IWGA website

Trampoline gymnastics at the 2009 World Games